Nastassia Ivanova (née Staravoitava; ; born November 4, 1982 in Zhodzina) is a Belarusian long-distance runner. She competed in the marathon at the 2012 Summer Olympics, placing 33rd with a time of 2:30:25. She competed in the women's marathon event at the 2016 Summer Olympics.

References

External links
 
 
 
 
 

1982 births
Living people
Belarusian female long-distance runners
Olympic athletes of Belarus
Athletes (track and field) at the 2012 Summer Olympics
Athletes (track and field) at the 2016 Summer Olympics
People from Zhodzina
Sportspeople from Minsk Region